Phoenix was launched in 1613, and appointed to escort Princess Elizabeth, daughter of James VI and I, and Frederick V of the Palatinate sailing in The Prince Royal from Margate to Ostend in April 1613.

The Phoenix known for its action on the coast of Ireland and west coast of Scotland in 1614 and 1615, commanded by Captain Button. Sir Oliver Lambert, commander of Irish forces for James I sailed in the Phoenix with the Moon to Aulderfleit in Knockfergus to embark 150 soldiers and cannon. They sailed to Islay in preparation to besiege Dunyvaig Castle where Captain Button stayed behind during storms until 18 January 1614, uncertain if there was "safe riding" at the Isle of Texa. The Moon came under heavy fire from the castle while attempting to unload the artillery. Button continued to use the Phoenix as Admiral of the Irish coast in 1620.

References

Ships of the line of the Royal Navy
1610s ships
Maritime incidents in 1614
Maritime incidents in 1615
Ships of the English navy